Jesús María is one of the most centrally located districts of Lima, Peru.  It is an upper class, high-density district and it usually ranks in the top districts with the best quality of life in Peru with an HDI of 0.8372 (2019), only behind the districts of La Molina and Lince.

Jesús María is located 103 meters above sea level and bordered by the districts of Pueblo Libre and Breña District on the west, downtown Lima on the north and east, Lince District on the southeast, and San Isidro and Magdalena del Mar on the south.  Until 1963, when it was made into a separate district, Jesús María was attached to Lima District.

History 

In the pre-Conquest period, the area that is now Jesús María was part of the Curacazgo of Guatca.  The lower end of the Rimac valley was divided among several districts ruled by a lord (curaca), each charged with administering the lands and water along a pre-Inca irrigation network.  The Curacazgo of Guatca followed the course of the canal known as the Huatica river.  After passing through what is today La Victoria, the Huatica's main subsidiary canal coursed down what is today Salaverry Avenue in Jesús María and, ultimately, reached the sea at Marbella in Magdalena del Mar district.

In the Spanish colonial period the area's lands were transferred to Spanish and criollo landlords, becoming haciendas, such as Jesús María, Matalechuza, and Matalechucitas. In the 20th Century, as urbanization spread the area was made part of the district of Lima.

In 1930 its inhabitants decided to formally organize themselves into the Jesús María neighborhood association. The following year they established the Pro-Jesús María District Civic Commission, with Mr. Enrique Mafuelo Caceres presiding.

On December 27, 1955, Congress approved Law 14763, establishing the District of Jesús María, but it was not put into effect.  Eight years later, on December 17, 1963, President Fernando Belaúnde Terry ratified the law and Jesús María District officially came into existence, although it did not have its own administration until the elections of November 1966, when José Benavides Muñoz was elected its first mayor.

Today, Jesús María is an upper class, highly residential district, home to 75,359 people. The district usually ranks in the top four districts with the best quality of life in Lima.  The district's central location and proximity to San Isidro and Miraflores, have also contributed to it becoming an increasingly popular residential option. Jesús María is experiencing a housing and construction boom, and many casonas (older large, luxury homes) are being replaced with high-rise apartments and condominiums.  Some of the best preserved are those that have been adapted as businesses or government installations, such as the Jesús María City Hall.

Between Salaverry and Gregorio Escobedo avenues can be found the Residencial San Felipe on the site of what was once the San Felipe horse track.  Commissioned by President Fernando Belaúnde Terry, and designed by a team headed in part by architects Enrique Ciriani, Jorge Páez, Jorge Bernuy, and Nikita Smirnoff Bracamonte, San Felipe was designed to combine a high residential density with ample green space, and shopping, banking, and schooling opportunities for residents, and is widely considered the cornerstone of Jesús María's middle-class identity.

Commercial activity in Jesús María has historically centered on the area surrounding the Plaza San José and the nearby old San José market, and on the commercial sector contained within the Residencial San Felipe.  To this, there has been added the Real Plaza Salaverry shopping mall, opened in May 2014, on the 23rd block of Avenida Salaverry, on land that held the last remnants of the old San Felipe race track.

Landmarks 
Important avenues which demarcate the boundaries of the district are Brasil, 28 de Julio. Arenales, General Salaverry, and Faustino Sánchez Carrión (commonly referred to by its old name, Ave. Pershing). Main avenues within Jesús María are San Felipe, Gregorio Escobedo, and Francisco Javier Mariàtegui. 

San José Park -which serves a de facto main square for the district- marks the district's original "downtown". Its San José Church, with its twin neo-Gothic spires, has been a landmark of the district since its inauguration by the Carmelite Order in 1949.

One of the largest parks in the city of Lima, El Campo de Marte, is located in Jesús María. It contains a monument to the War of 1942 fought between Peru and Ecuador, the monument to a century of Japanese immigration, and the Eye that Cries, commemorating those killed and disappeared during Peru's internal conflict between 1980 and 1992.  It is also home to the district's municipal sports complex. Nearby can be found the Ministry of Labor and Ministry of Health

The Edgardo Rebagliati Martins Hospital (shared with Lince district) one of the largest and busiest health centers in the country. The district is also home to San Marcos University's Museum of Natural History, which was established in 1918 and houses important Peruvian fossils and the specimen collection of early Peruvian geographer and explorer, Antonio Raimondi. 

Other important medical centers within the district are the private Clĺnica San Felipe, and the national Police and Military Hospitals.

The Universidad del Pacífico, one of the most prestigious universities in economy, is located in Jesús María, on Avenida Salaverry.  Several renowned research institutions also have their offices in Jesus Maria, including the Instituto de Estudios Peruanos (IEP) and the Centro Peruano de Estudios Sociales (CEPES). The Derrama Magisterial -the public school teachers' social security administration-, the Lima Chamber of Commerce, and the Frecuencia Latina TV studios, the Embassy of Japan, the Embassy of Guatemala, the consulates of Belgium, Turkey, and Italy, and the Papal Nunciature, are all also located within district. Jesus Maria is also host to the yearly Lima International Book Fair.

Climate 
Summer (January–April), high 26 to 30 °C, low 20 to 23 °C, sunny days with cloudy nights and early mornings.

Winter (June–November) high 18 to 20 °C, low 14 to 16 °C, usually overcast with frequent fog.

Humidity: 60% to 70% summer afternoons, 90% to 100% in winter and at night.

Gallery

See also 
 Administrative divisions of Peru

External links
  Municipalidad de Jesús María - Jesús María district council official website

References

Districts of Lima